The Guryak truck bridge is a bridge connecting the districts of Nurgal and Khas Kunar in Konar Province, Afghanistan.
The  bridge was opened on February 17, 2009.
The bridge cost $1.7 million.

Construction was overseen by the Konar Provincial Reconstruction Team.
Construction was completed on time and on budget by the Abdul Haq Foundation.

References

Road bridges in Afghanistan
Kunar Province
Bridges completed in 2009
2009 establishments in Afghanistan